Ngayon at Kailanman (International title: Now and Forever) is a 2018 Philippine drama television series starring Julia Barretto and Joshua Garcia. The series premiered on ABS-CBN's Primetime Bida evening block and worldwide via The Filipino Channel from August 20, 2018 to January 18, 2019, replacing Bagani.

Series overview

Episodes

Season 1 (2018–19)

References

Ngayon